Dalene Kay Stangl is an American statistician known for development and promotion of Bayesian statistical methods in health-related research.

Education and career
Stangl grew up on a farm in Cass County, Iowa, and was the first in her family to attain a Ph.D. She graduated from Iowa State University in 1978 with a bachelor's degree in psychology and sociology, and earned a master's degree in 1980 from the University of Iowa. She later attended graduate school at Carnegie Mellon University, she earned a second master's degree in statistics in 1988 and a Ph.D. in 1991. Her dissertation was Modeling Heterogeneity in Multi-center Clinical Trials Using Bayesian Hierarchical Models.

Stangl worked for 25 years as a faculty member at Duke University, beginning in 1992 and eventually becoming Professor of the Practice of Statistics and Public Policy and director of the Institute of Statistics and Decision Science. In 2017 she moved back to Carnegie Mellon University where she is now emeritus.

Contributions
With Don Berry, Stangl has edited books on Bayesian methods in biostatistics and on meta-analysis.

She chaired the Section on Bayesian Statistical Science (2006) and the Committee on Women in Statistics (2011–2016) of the American Statistical Association. She is a founder of the annual Women in Statistics and Data Science conference.

Recognition
In 2002, Stangl was elected to be a Fellow of the American Statistical Association.In 2019, Stangl was presented with a Founders Award by the American Statistical Association.

References

External links
Home page

Year of birth missing (living people)
Living people
American women statisticians
Iowa State University alumni
University of Iowa alumni
Fellows of the American Statistical Association
Carnegie Mellon University alumni
Duke University faculty